The Middle (stylized as the middle.) is an American television sitcom that aired on ABC from September 30, 2009, to May 22, 2018. The series, set in Indiana, follows a lower middle class family living and facing the day-to-day struggles of home life, work, and raising children. Starring Patricia Heaton and Neil Flynn, the show was created by former Roseanne and Murphy Brown writers Eileen Heisler and DeAnn Heline, and produced by Warner Bros. Television and Blackie and Blondie Productions. It was praised by television critics and earned numerous award nominations.

A spin-off of the series, centered around Eden Sher's character, Sue Heck, was set to launch in 2019. However, ABC passed on the project. It was shopped to other networks but was never picked up.

Premise 
The series features Frances "Frankie" Heck (Patricia Heaton), a middle class, middle aged, Midwestern woman and her husband Mike (Neil Flynn), who reside in the small fictional town of Orson, Indiana, based on the real town of Jasper, Indiana. They are the parents of three children, Axl (Charlie McDermott), Sue (Eden Sher), and Brick (Atticus Shaffer).

The series is narrated by Frankie, initially an under-performing salesperson at a used-car dealership and later a dental assistant. Her stoic husband Mike manages a local quarry and serves as a stabilizing influence in the family, though Frankie complains about his lack of affection at times. The kids are quite different from one another: oldest son Axl, a popular but lazy teenager, does well in sports but not in academics; daughter Sue is an enthusiastic young teen but chronically unsuccessful and socially awkward; and youngest son Brick is an intelligent but introverted compulsive reader with odd behavioral traits loosely hinted to derive from autism. Other characters include Frankie's co-worker Bob (main character in the first two seasons), Frankie's elderly Aunt Edie, Sue's first boyfriend Brad, and Mike's brother Rusty, Axl's friends Sean and Darrin, both had a relationship with Sue.

Cast and characters 

 Patricia Heaton as Frances Patricia "Frankie" Heck (née Spence)
 Neil Flynn as Michael Bartholomew "Mike" Heck Jr.
 Charlie McDermott as Axl Redford Heck
 Eden Sher as Sue Sue Heck 
 Atticus Shaffer as Brick Ishmail Heck
 Chris Kattan as Bob Weaver (main, seasons 1 & 2; recurring, season 3; special guest, seasons 4 & 5)

Episodes

Development and production 
The series was originally developed in the 2006–07 development cycle for ABC and was to star Ricki Lake as Frankie. Atticus Shaffer was the only actor to retain his role when the show was re-developed. ABC later ordered a second pilot tied to Patricia Heaton being cast in the leading role for the 2008-09 development cycle. The series was created by Eileen Heisler and DeAnn Heline (who is from Muncie, Indiana) and the pilot was directed by Julie Anne Robinson.

The show was originally set to take place in Jasper, Indiana, though the setting was changed to the fictional Orson, Indiana, on the advice of attorneys. However, Orson is based on and presumed to be located near Jasper. The show was filmed in Stage 31 at the Warner Bros. Ranch, with the house's exterior and Elhert Motors on the ranch's Blondie Street. Set director Julie Fanton shops at traditionally mid-western places, such as Target and Kohl's, so the show appears to have a realistic middle-class look.

The series was picked up for a full season of 24 episodes after airing just two episodes. On January 12, 2010, ABC Entertainment President Steve McPherson announced that he was renewing The Middle for a second season. The show was renewed for a third season. The third season premiered with a one-hour episode on September 21, 2011. On May 10, 2012, ABC renewed the show for a fourth season, which premiered with a one-hour special on September 26, 2012. The show was renewed for a fifth season on May 10, 2013. ABC confirmed on May 9, 2014, that the series was picked up for a sixth season of 22 episodes, and officially ordered an additional two episodes in October of that year, bringing the season six total to 24.

On May 8, 2015, ABC officially picked up the series for a seventh season, renewing the contracts of the main cast at the same time.  ABC renewed the series for season eight with a 22-episode order, later expanded to 23 episodes in December 2016.

The series was renewed for a ninth season on January 25, 2017, with filming beginning on August 15, 2017. On August 2, 2017, it was announced that the series would end after its ninth season, at the request of the series' creators. The two-hour series finale aired on May 22, 2018.

Release

Broadcast 
The Middle premiered on ABC in the United States on September 30, 2009. The series aired on City (formerly Citytv) in Canada from the third to ninth season. Previously, the show aired on A (now CTV Two) during its first season. In Australia, the show premiered on December 7, 2009, on Nine Network. The New Zealand premiere was on May 8, 2010, on TV2. In India, the show premiered on January 5, 2015, on Romedy Now. In the UK, it premiered on August 29, 2010, on Sky1. Season 5 premiered on Comedy Central UK on January 21, 2014, and in Ireland on April 16, 2014, on TV3. It has been adapted in Hindi on Reliance Broadcast Network comedy channel BIG MAGIC as Tedi Medi Family. It is also broadcast on the Neox Channel in Spain and Warner Channel in Latin America and Brazil. In Bulgaria the series premiered in late 2019 alongside Young Sheldon on the Bulgarian pay television channel bTV Comedy. It was dubbed by studio MediaLink.

Syndication 

On March 6, 2012, it was announced that ABC Family (now Freeform) obtained the rights to The Middle, which began airing the series on September 9, 2013, until August 22, 2022.

Also, the series debuted in local syndication on September 16, 2013. As of September 2017, the show is no longer available for local syndication.

Hallmark Channel also acquired The Middle for syndication, which began airing in March 2014. However, the series left the network in August 2018. On August 5, 2019, the series rejoined the Hallmark Channel's line-up, airing in a block from 6:00-8:00 A.M. As of October 2019, the series has once again left the schedule. On May 17, 2021, the series once again rejoined the Hallmark Channel's line-up, airing in a block from 1:00-3:00 P.M.

Streaming 
The series began streaming on HBO Max in the US on December 1, 2020. The series was streaming on IMDB TV, but has since left. The series is available to stream on HBO Max in Bulgaria on March 8, 2022, but only with English audio. As of 2022, the series streams on Peacock in the United States.

Home media 

In Region 1, seasons 1–4 had an official retail release. Seasons 5-9 were released as a MOD DVD-R via the Warner Archive Collection. The Canadian releases continue to be traditionally manufactured and sold, but are otherwise identical to their American counterparts. Distribution for regions 2 and 4 ended after the fourth season.

Reception

Critical reception 
The Middle received positive reviews from critics, citing its unique and original characters, and praising the show's consistent standard and realistic portrayal of lower-middle-class families. It holds a score of 71 out of 100 on the review aggregator website Metacritic. Critics also praised the show's timing, writing, and acting; e.g., Robert Bianco of USA Today wrote, "...This series seems to more assuredly offer a first-class version of what so many viewers say they want: a humorous, heartfelt, realistic look at middle-class, middle-America family life." Entertainment Weeklys Ken Tucker observed in season 2 that The Middle continues to be "a rock-solid show, the saga of a family struggling to keep their heads above the choppy economic waters."

In the 2009–2010 season, The Middle ranked number six on Metacritic's "Best Reviewed New Network Show" list. Airing behind the quickly cancelled Hank during its first season, ratings were not initially impressive, averaging fewer than 7 million viewers. At the start of the 2010/2011 season, ABC moved the show to the beginning of its prime time block (8:00 pm EDT), and ratings increased substantially, with the show usually ranking second in its time slot to CBS's Survivor.

In 2016, Bob Sassone of Esquire published an article called "The Middle Is the Best TV Show You're Not Watching", wherein he expresses the dissatisfaction of the series not having received nominations for several awards nor the deserved attention of the critics; he noted: "The Middle is the finest American sitcom on TV right now". After ABC confirmed that the ninth season of The Middle would be the last, Devon Ivie of Vulture wrote: "The Middle Is One of TV’s Most Underrated Gems", sharing, "I’ll miss the midwestern comfort of The Middle tremendously", and enumerating five reasons why readers should give the show a chance to charm them.

Ratings 

Season 3's "Halloween II" was the most watched episode of the series, viewed by 10.16 million viewers.

Awards and nominations 
In 2011, The Middle received a Gracie Award for Outstanding Comedy Series. The 1st Critics' Choice Television Awards nominated the series for Best Comedy Series, Patricia Heaton for Best Actress in a Comedy Series, and Eden Sher for Best Supporting Actress in a Comedy Series.

Spin-off

Development
On May 30, 2018, Variety reported that a spin-off was being eyed following the cancellation of Roseanne. Almost two months later, on July 20, 2018, in an interview with TVLine's Michael Ausiello, Sher revealed that ABC had ordered a pilot for the potential series. It was noted that the potential spin-off would be set a few years after the parent series ended and follow Sue Heck as an adult.<ref name="SueSpinoff"/ The spin-off was officially ordered on August 13, 2018, and will follow "the twentysomething adventures of eternal optimist Sue Heck as she leaves the small town of Orson to navigate the ups and downs of a career and young adulthood in the big city of Chicago". As of October 5, 2018, the pilot was being filmed. The series was originally to be titled Sue Sue in the City, but this decision was later reversed, and the series remained untitled.  On November 21, 2018, TVLine and Deadline reported that the proposed spin-off would not be moving forward at ABC; it is being shopped to other networks.

Casting
On October 5, 2018, it was announced that major recurring character Brad Bottig, played by Brock Ciarlleli, had joined the cast as a series regular. A few days later on October 8, 2018, it was reported that Kimberley Crossman would join the cast as Remi, a hotel chef still recovering from a messy breakup that ended with her boyfriend driving away with their food truck and taking all of her dreams with it. It was also revealed that Sue would find herself working at the same hotel as Remi. On October 10, 2018, Finesse Mitchell joined the cast as Hudson, a bartender with a big heart who works at the same hotel as Sue. The following day, it was announced that Silicon Valley's Chris Diamantopoulos would play Sue's “mercurial, charming and rich” boss Nick, with newcomer Aaron Branch playing Otis, the hotel's naïve but endearing bellhop.

References

External links 

 

 
2000s American single-camera sitcoms
2009 American television series debuts
2010s American single-camera sitcoms
2018 American television series endings
American Broadcasting Company original programming
English-language television shows
Mass media portrayals of the middle class
Television series about children
Television series about families
Television series about marriage
Television series by Warner Bros. Television Studios
Television shows featuring audio description
Television shows filmed in California
Television shows set in Indiana